John Sem is a Papua New Guinean Olympic boxer. He represented his country in the bantamweight division at the 1992 Summer Olympics. He lost his first bout against Serafim Todorov of Bulgaria.

References

1973 births
Living people
Bantamweight boxers
Papua New Guinean male boxers
Olympic boxers of Papua New Guinea
Boxers at the 1992 Summer Olympics